Duggondi is a village and a mandal in Warangal district in the state of Telangana in India.

 List of Villages in  Duggondi  Mandal
1. Adavi Rangapur 2. Chalparthi 3. Duggondi 4. Keshwapur 5. Laxmipur 6. Madhira Mandapalle 7. Mahammadapur 8. Mallampalle 9. Mandapalle 10. Muddunoor 11. Nachinapalle 12. Polaram 13. Ponakal 14. Reballe 15. Rekampalle 16. Timmampet 17. Togarrai 18. Venkatapur .19. Girnivbavi

References
 villageinfo.in

Mandals in Warangal district
Villages in Warangal district